Max Örnskog (born 27 February 1994) is a Swedish ice hockey player. He made his Elitserien debut playing with HV71 during the 2012–13 Elitserien season.

References

External links

1994 births
Swedish ice hockey centres
HV71 players
Sportspeople from Jönköping
Living people